The Throwdowns is an American pop-island-reggae-dance band from Maui, Hawaii, formed in 2009.

The band released their first album, entitled Legs Of Our Own, on August 6, 2011.

In October 2010, The Throwdowns were nominated for two Na Hoku Hanohano Awards (Hawaiian Grammy's). The nominations were both for the "Don't Slow Down" EP: "Rock Album of the Year (Best performance of music in a rock style)" and "Design (Best designed and created album package)".

The band's style has been compared to The Clash, the Yeah Yeah Yeahs, No Doubt, and PJ Harvey.

Discography
Don't Slow Down (2009)
Legs Of Our Own (2011)
 Love is Here To Stay (2012)
Must Be The Wine (2020)

References

External links

YouTube
Facebook

Musical groups from Hawaii
Musical groups established in 2009
Warner Music Group artists